John Moore (born 9 September 1945) is an English former footballer who played in the Football League for Shrewsbury Town, Swansea City and Stoke City.

Career
Moore was born in Liverpool and began his career with Everton's youth team before joining Stoke City in 1967. He was thrust into the first team due to injuries and played in 13 matches during the 1967–68 season. However it was a poor season for Stoke as they were almost relegated and in the 13 matches played in defence Stoke lost nine of them conceding 32 goals. He was released from his contract and signed for Third Division Shrewsbury Town. He became a regular for the "Shrews", playing 159 matches for the club and scoring once, against Rotherham United on 15 August 1970. He then spent a year and a half at Welsh club Swansea City before retiring due to injury.

Career statistics
 Sourced from

References

External links
 

1945 births
Living people
English footballers
Stoke City F.C. players
Everton F.C. players
Shrewsbury Town F.C. players
Swansea City A.F.C. players
English Football League players
United Soccer Association players
Association football defenders